Lucas Ayrton "Pocho" Román (born 10 February 2004) is an Argentine footballer who plays as a forward for the Spanish club FC Barcelona Atlètic.

Club career
A youth product of Ferro Carril Oeste since the age of 6, Román signed his first professional contract with the side on 23 July 2020 until 2022. He made his professional debut with the club in a Primera Nacional match against Quilmes on 28 February 2022. He extended his contract with the club on 3 June 2022, until December 2023.

Barcelona 
On 18 January 2023, Barcelona Atlètic announced an agreement with Ferro Carril Oeste to sign Román on a permanent deal, as the player signed a contract up to 30 June 2026, including a 400 million euro release clause.

International career
Román has been called up to the Argentina U20s under manager Javier Mascherano, winning the 2022 L'Alcúdia International Football Tournament and acting as part of the preparatory squad for the 2023 South American U-20 Championship.

Playing style
Román is a left-footed forward who can also act as a winger. He is a mobile and creative forward who can start plays in the midfield or on the wing, often on the right where he can cut inside to his stronger foot. He has a good shot from distance, and is known for his winning mentality.

References

External links
 
 

2004 births
Living people
Footballers from Buenos Aires
Argentine footballers
Argentina youth international footballers
Ferro Carril Oeste footballers
Primera Nacional players
Association football forwards
FC Barcelona Atlètic players
Primera Federación players
Argentine expatriate footballers
Argentine expatriate sportspeople in Spain
Expatriate footballers in Spain